Ken Timms (born 23 July 1938) is a former Australian rules footballer who played for Essendon in the VFL. 

A forward pocket in Essendon's 1962 premiership side, Timms played a total of nine seasons with Essendon and kicked 31 goals in 1963.

External links

1938 births
Australian rules footballers from Victoria (Australia)
Essendon Football Club players
Essendon Football Club Premiership players
Living people
One-time VFL/AFL Premiership players